The Kalamata Dance Megaron is a dance hall located in Kalamata, Greece. The venue is able to act as a convention center.

The venue has hosted the Kalamata International Dance Festival and the Kalamata International Choir Festival.

References

Kalamata
Buildings and structures in Messenia